Noble Local School District is the largest district in Noble County, Ohio. Shenandoah Elementary and Shenandoah High are the only two schools in the district. The campus is located in Sarahsville, Ohio. Dr. Matt Unger is the superintendent.

History

Schools
Shenandoah Elementary School (PK-8)
Shenandoah High School

References

External links
Noble Local School District

Education in Noble County, Ohio
School districts in Ohio
School districts established in 1963